Tyrannosauripus is an ichnogenus of dinosaur footprint. It was discovered by geologist Charles "Chuck" Pillmore in 1983 and formally described by Martin Lockley and Adrian Hunt in 1994. This fossil footprint from northern New Mexico is 86 cm long and given its Late Cretaceous age (about 66 million years old), it very likely belonged to the giant theropod dinosaur Tyrannosaurus rex. In 2016 the size of this individual was estimated at 11.4 meters (37.4 ft) and 5.8-6.9 tonnes (6.4-7.6 short tons). Similar tridactyl dinosaur tracks in North America were discovered earlier and named Tyrannosauropus in 1971,  but they were later recognized as hadrosaurid tracks and their description deemed inadequate, with Tyrannosauropus regarded as a nomen dubium. True footprints likely from Tyrannosaurus would not be found until the discovery of Tyrannosauripus. In 2007, a large tyrannosaurid track was found also in eastern Montana (Hell Creek Formation). In 2016, a  probable fossil trackway of Tyrannosaurus was discovered in Wyoming (Lance Formation).

References

External links
 No Australian Tyrannosauropus After all - Lark Quarry Revisited
 http://www.smh.com.au/travel/activity/active/land-of-the-giants-20081113-65cf.html
 Ve stopách posledních gigantů

Dinosaur trace fossils